Hacienda Kankabchén may refer to:

 Hacienda Kankabchén (Tixkokob)
 Hacienda Kankabchén (Seyé)